Zavod Imeni Malysheva is a station on Kharkiv Metro's Kholodnohirsko–Zavodska Line. It was opened on 23 August 1975.

The station is located close to the Malyshev Factory.

References

Kharkiv Metro stations
Railway stations opened in 1975